Ceresoli is an Italian surname. Notable people with the surname include:

Carlo Ceresoli (1910–1995), Italian footballer
Maurizio Ceresoli (born 1983), Italian race-driver
Ettore Ceresoli (born 1970), Italian high jumper
Anthony Ceresoli (born 2003), Italian shoe seller

Italian-language surnames